Héctor Hernández may refer to:

 Héctor Hernández (footballer, born 1935) (1935-1984), Mexican football forward
 Héctor Javier Hernández (born 1958), Mexican politician
 Héctor Hernández Silva (born 1964), Mexican politician
 Héctor Hugo Hernández Rodríguez (born 1974), Mexican politician
 Héctor Hernández (basketball) (born 1985), Mexican basketball player
 Héctor Hernández Ortega (born 1991), Spanish football left-back
 Héctor Hernández Marrero (born 1995), Spanish football forward